Niphadoses hoplites is a moth in the family Crambidae. It was described by Ian Francis Bell Common in 1960. It is found in Australia.

References

Moths described in 1960
Schoenobiinae